Antonio Seneca (died 11 August 1626) was a Roman Catholic prelate who served as Bishop of Anagni (1607–1626).

Biography
On 25 June 1607, Antonio Seneca was appointed during the papacy of Pope Paul V as Bishop of Anagni.
On 2 July 1607, he was consecrated bishop by Ludovico de Torres, Archbishop of Monreale, with Girolamo di Porzia, Bishop of Adria, and Claudio Rangoni, Bishop of Reggio Emilia, serving as co-consecrators. 
He served as Bishop of Anagni until his death on 11 August 1626.

Episcopal succession
While bishop, he was the principal co-consecrator of:

References

External links and additional sources
 (for Chronology of Bishops)
 (for Chronology of Bishops)

17th-century Italian Roman Catholic bishops
Bishops appointed by Pope Paul V
1626 deaths